Hadar in Iran may refer to:
 Hadar, Khoy (هدر - Ḩadar), West Azerbaijan Province
 Hadar, Salmas (هدر - Ḩadar), West Azerbaijan Province